The 1993 Royal Liver Assurance UK Championship was a  professional ranking snooker tournament that took place at the Guild Hall in Preston, England. The event started on 12 November 1993, and the televised stages were shown on BBC between 20 and 28 November 1993. The highest break of the tournament was a 141 made by David Roe.

Ronnie O'Sullivan became the youngest winner of a ranking event at the age of 17 years and 358 days by defeating Stephen Hendry 10–6 in the final; as of 2023 this record still stands. This was the first of O'Sullivan's record seven titles at the tournament.

Prize fund
The breakdown of prize money for this year is shown below:
Total Prize money: £375,000
Winner: £70,000
Runner-up: £35,000
Semi-Final: £18,500
Quarter-Final: £10,325
Last 16: £5,250
Last 32: £3,000
Last 64: £1,850
Last 96: £650
Last 128: £475
High break (TV stages): £3,000
High break (Pre TV stages): £1,500
Maximum break (TV stage): £20,000
Maximum break (Pre TV stage): £5,000

Main draw

Final

Century breaks

All Rounds

 141  David Roe
 140  Stuart Pettman
 138, 120  John Parrott
 136  Nick Walker
 135  Jim Chambers
 132, 131, 123, 114, 111, 109, 109, 108, 107, 106  Stephen Hendry
 131  Mike Hallett
 131  John Shilton
 129, 128, 106, 105  Darren Morgan
 126, 115, 103  Martin O'Neill
 126, 110, 106  Steve Davis
 122, 121, 118, 114, 113, 107, 105, 103  Ronnie O'Sullivan
 122, 120, 106  Tony Drago
 121, 114  Ken Doherty
 120, 115, 110  Anthony Hamilton
 119  Richy McDonald
 116, 109, 100  Dave Harold
 116  Alex Borg

 114, 106  Joe Canny
 112  Wilfred Dijkstra
 112  Daniel Haenga
 111  Spencer Dunn
 109, 103, 101  Jimmy White
 109  Tony Jones
 108  Mark Whatley
 106  Matthew Couch
 106  Paul McPhillips
 106  Paul Tanner
 105  Troy Shaw
 102, 101  Nigel Bond
 102  Martin Clark
 102  Anthony Harris
 102  Sonic Multani
 102  James Wattana
 101  Gay Burns
 100  Dean Reynolds

References

1993
UK Championship
UK Championship
UK Championship